Bruno Appels (born 15 August 1988) is a Belgian former professional footballer who played as a goalkeeper. During his career, he played for Willem II, FC Den Bosch, ASV Geel and Berchem Sport.

Career
Appels played in the youth academy of Dutch club Willem II since age 10 and in July 2009 he made the move to Eerste Divisie club FC Den Bosch. On 3 September 2010, he made his professional debut in a match against Telstar. For several seasons, Appels acted as the team's second goalkeeper behind Kevin Begois. In February 2012, he extended his contract with FC Den Bosch until 2014. Ahead of the 2013–14 season, manager Ruud Kaiser promoted Appels to starting goalkeeper. He only played the first game of the season before being sidelined for an extended period with injuries. He only returned to the starting eleven in February 2014.

In June 2015, he was briefly on trial with his former club Willem II, but he eventually signed for Belgian Second Division club ASV Geel ahead of the 2015–16 season. During the winter break he returned to FC Den Bosch but soon suffered another injury.

In June 2016, Appels signed with Belgian Division 2 club Berchem Sport.

In July 2021, Appels announced his retirement from football, instead focusing on his new career as a goalkeepers coach at Turnhout.

References

External links
 Voetbal International profile 
 

1988 births
Living people
Belgian footballers
Belgian expatriate footballers
Willem II (football club) players
FC Den Bosch players
AS Verbroedering Geel players
K. Berchem Sport players
Eerste Divisie players
Eredivisie players
Challenger Pro League players
Belgian Third Division players
Sportspeople from Turnhout
Association football goalkeepers
Belgian expatriate sportspeople in the Netherlands
Expatriate footballers in the Netherlands
Footballers from Antwerp Province
21st-century Belgian people